MTT-S Geographic Activities Committee studies and manages microwave sciences, engineering, and theory around the internationally. They are one of the IEEE Microwave Theory and Techniques Society's technical and administrative committees.

The committee
Dr. Wu is the committee's current chairman, with Bela Szendrenyi and Shiban Koul as the vice-chairs.

Membership
It is free to join and all members work on a volunteer basis.

Publications
The MTT-S publishes the IEEE Microwave Magazine monthly.

References
 MTT About Page
 Committee Listing

Microwave technology